The Sound of Harris is a channel between the islands of Harris and North Uist in the Outer Hebrides of Scotland.

Geography
Approximately  in width, the Sound of Harris provides the main sea passage through the Hebridean archipelago, from the Atlantic Ocean to The Minch. There are many islands and numerous reefs in the Sound, the largest being Berneray, Pabbay, Ensay and Killegray.  It is part of the South Lewis, Harris and North Uist National Scenic Area, one of 40 in Scotland.

Ferry
Since 1996, a vehicle ferry links Leverburgh, Harris to Berneray, itself connected by causeway to North Uist. Until the Berneray Causeway opened, the ferry landed at Otternish. The service is operated by Caledonian MacBrayne and was provided by  until 2003, when she was replaced by the much larger, . A buoyed route is marked to ensure the ferry's safe passage. The MCA require that the vessel only proceed if the next two marker buoys are visible.

Footnotes

 
Harris
Landforms of the Outer Hebrides
Uist
Harris, Outer Hebrides